Nandurbar Lok Sabha constituency is one of the 48 Lok Sabha (parliamentary) constituencies of Maharashtra state in western India. Presently, four of its Vidhan Sabha segments are located in Nandurbar district, while the other two segments are located in Dhule district.

Assembly segments
Presently, after the implementation of the delimitation of the parliamentary constituencies in 2008, Nandurbar Lok Sabha constituency comprises six Vidhan Sabha segments. These segments are:

Before the delimitation, Nandurbar Lok Sabha constituency comprised the following six Vidhan Sabha (legislative assembly) segments:
 Nawapur 
 Nandurbar
 Talode
 Akrani
 Shahade
 Shirpur

Members of Parliament

^ denotes by-poll

Election results

General elections 2019

General elections 2014

General elections 2009

1981 by-poll
In 1981, a bye-election was held in for the Nandurbar seat due to the resignation of the sitting MP, S.S. Naik. The election was won by the INC candidate Manikrao Hodlya Gavit with 188550 votes, while the runner-up was A.S.F. Jadhav of Janata Party with 61157 votes.

See also
 Nandurbar district
 Dhule district

External links
Nandurbar lok sabha  constituency election 2019 results details

Notes

 List of Constituencies of the Lok Sabha

Lok Sabha constituencies in Maharashtra
Nandurbar district
Dhule district